Fabrizio Tabaton (born 16 May 1955) is an Italian former rally driver.

Racing career

European Rally Championship
Competing for the H.F. Grifone team, he had his biggest successes in the European Rally Championship, which he won with a Lancia Delta S4 in 1986, and with a Lancia Delta Integrale and a Delta HF 4WD in 1988. He also finished runner-up twice; in 1985 to Dario Cerrato and in 1991 to Piero Liatti. In 1990, Tabaton placed third in the championship.

Italian Rally Championship

In the Italian Rally Championship, he captured the title in 1985 with a Lancia Rally 037 and in 1987 with a Delta HF 4WD.

World Rally Championship
In the World Rally Championship, Tabaton competed at his home event, the Rallye Sanremo, seven times. He retired in all but two occasions; driving for the Grifone team, he took fourth place in 1984 in a 037, and fifth place in 1987 in a Delta HF 4WD. He made a one-off return to the WRC in the 1999 season, competing with a Toyota Corolla WRC at the Monte Carlo Rally, but retired on the ninth stage.

Post-racing career
After his racing career, Tabaton has worked as the head of the Grifone and Step2 organizations, which have continued their extensive programmes in European rallying. Grifone was also responsible for MotoGP star Valentino Rossi's WRC debut at the 2002 Wales Rally GB in a Peugeot 206 WRC.

References

External links
 Profile at ewrc-results.com

1955 births
Italian rally drivers
Living people
World Rally Championship drivers
European Rally Championship drivers